Acanthodactylus is a genus of lacertid lizards, commonly referred to as fringe-fingered lizards, fringe-toed lizards (though the latter common name is also used for the New World lizard genus Uma), and spiny-toed lizards.

Geographic range
The approximately 40 species in the genus Acanthodactylus are native to a wide area in North Africa, southern Europe and Western Asia; across the Sahara Desert, to the Iberian Peninsula, and east through the Arabian Peninsula, to Afghanistan and western India.

Habitat
Though lizards of the genus Acanthodactylus prefer dry and sparsely vegetated regions, they are not strictly tied to an arid terrain; so it is not uncommon to come across them in various environments.

Description
Members of the genus Acanthodactylus possess the following combination of traits:
Lacking occipital scales,
Flat ventral scales, 
Fingers with three or four series of scales, 
Toes with comb-like projections, 
Femoral pores present, 
Parietal foramen present.

The coloration and pattern of spots of Acanthodactylus is extremely variable, so it is unsurprising that zoologists have, at one time or another, classified every variety as a separate species.

Behavior
Every saurian of the genus Acanthodactylus is very aggressive and gets continuously involved in skirmishes with other members of its species. The males strenuously defend the borders of their territories.

Reproduction
Acanthodactylus are oviparous. The number of eggs in a clutch ranges from 3 to 7. The total length of a sexually mature adult of the genus is, on average, .

Classification
Genus Acanthodactylus 

Nota bene: A binomial authority in parentheses indicates that the species was originally described in a genus other than Acanthodactylus.

References

Further reading
Boulenger GA (1887). Catalogue of the Lizards in the British Museum (Natural History). Second Edition. Volume III. Lacertidæ, ... London: Trustees of the British Museum (Natural History). (Taylor and Francis, printers). xii + 575 pp. + Plates I-XL. (Genus Acanthodactylus, p. 58).
Wiegmann AFA (1834). Herpetologia Mexicana, ... Pars Prima, Saurorum Species, ... Berlin: C.G. Lüderitz. vi + 54 pp. + Plates I-X. (Acanthodactylus, new genus, p. 10). (in Latin).

External links

Acanthodactylus: Fringe-Fingered Lizards

 
Desert fauna
Lizard genera
Taxa named by Arend Friedrich August Wiegmann